Kismet Acoustic is a 2008 EP by California artist Jesca Hoop, containing one song original to the album, and the remaining four being acoustic versions of songs from her earlier album Kismet.

Track listing
 "Murder of Birds" – 4:33
 "Intelligentactile 101" – 4:26
 "Seed of Wonder" – 5:24
 "Out the Back Door" – 3:02
 "Love & Love Again" – 4:35

Jesca Hoop albums
2008 EPs